Scutiger nepalensis, otherwise known as the Nepal lazy toad,  is a species of amphibian in the family Megophryidae. It is found in Nepal, possibly China, and possibly India. Its natural habitats are subtropical or tropical high-altitude grassland and rivers. It is threatened by habitat loss.

References

nepalensis
Amphibians of Nepal
Endemic fauna of Nepal
Taxonomy articles created by Polbot
Amphibians described in 1974